Shawnee Run is a stream in the U.S. state of West Virginia.

Shawnee Run was named after the Shawnee Indians.

See also
List of rivers of West Virginia

References

Rivers of Pleasants County, West Virginia
Rivers of West Virginia